Sandra Brycks "Sandie" Rinaldo (born 16 January 1950) is a Canadian television journalist and anchor for CTV News.

Youth and education
She was born in Toronto, and was first seen on television as a dancer during the mid-1960s on CBC Television youth series such as Where It's At. Rinaldo graduated from York University's Fine Arts program with an Honours Bachelor of Arts in 1973.

Broadcasting career
A week after graduation, Rinaldo joined CTV Television Network's news division, initially working as a junior secretary to Donald Cameron, director of news. She later advanced to production manager then research for W5, as well as reporting for CTV National News and Canada AM. She became anchor for the newscasts on Canada AM in 1980, making her the first woman in Canada to hold a full-time position as a national news anchor. She is most well known for disrespecting Bob Marley, whom she interviewed when he visited Canada on tour. Years later, as Rinaldo looked back on her interview with the musical icon, she said, "I wish I could do it again, because there were a lot of questions I asked that I probably shouldn’t have at the time." In 1985 she became weekend anchor of CTV National News, a post she has held ever since, except for a brief period from 1990 to 1991 during which she was co-anchor with Tom Gibney of the local World Beat News on the network's Toronto affiliate CFTO.

Since longtime weekday anchor Lloyd Robertson's retirement in 2011, Rinaldo has served as substitute anchor for Robertson's successor, Lisa LaFlamme, on the main weekday national newscast. Since 2009, she has been anchoring CTV News Channel three weekday afternoons. As of 2010, she is also a co-host of W5 and a contributing reporter.

She was married to Michael Rinaldo ( 1945–2005) until his death, and has three daughters.

Awards
A list of awards won by Rinaldo:

 Bryden Alumni Award, York University (2005)
 RTNDA award for Best Newscast for coverage (1999)
 World Medal from the International Film and TV Festival, New York (1997)
 Finalist Certificate for Best News Anchor, International Film and TV Festival, New York (1991)
 Silver Medal for Best Coverage of an Ongoing News Story, International Film and TV Festival, New York (1991)
 Silver Medal, Best Coverage of an Ongoing News Story, International Film and TV Festival, New York (1991)
 Bronze Medal, Best News Anchor, International Film & TV Festival, New York (1990)
 Silver Medal, Best Analysis of a Single Current News Story, Houston International Film Festival (1990)
 American Film & Video Award for "Childbirth From Inside-Out" (1990)

References

External links
 Sandie Rinaldo - Weekend Anchor -- CTV News Team

1950 births
Living people
Canadian television news anchors
Canadian women television journalists
CTV Television Network people
Journalists from Toronto
York University alumni
20th-century Canadian journalists
21st-century Canadian journalists
20th-century Canadian women